Hung Shui Kiu is a proposed MTR station on the . It will be located at Hung Shui Kiu, Yuen Long, New Territories, Hong Kong. The station is still under planning, it may be built depending on the development of Hung Shui Kiu New Town.

The station may also be served by the proposed Hong Kong-Shenzhen Airport Rail Link between Hong Kong International Airport and Shenzhen Bao'an International Airport.

References

Yuen Long District
Proposed railway stations in Hong Kong
MTR stations in the New Territories